Pavlou is a Greek surname. Notable people with the surname include:

George Pavlou, English film director
Kyriacos Pavlou (born 1986), Cypriot footballer
Stel Pavlou (born 1970), English author
Drew Pavlou, Australian pro-Hong Kong activist

Greek-language surnames
Surnames from given names